The Falkenfelsen (Falcon Rock) is a granite rock formation in the Northern Black Forest of Germany's Baden-Württemberg state. From the Schwarzwaldhochstrasse (Black Forest Highway), two hiking trails lead through the formation and end at the shelter Herta-hut. The platform has a view over the northern Black Forest, with the Hornisgrinde in the south, Bühlerhöhe in the northeast and the valley of the Upper Rhine on the west.

External links 
 Falkenfelsen at Environment Ministry of Baden-Württemberg (German)

Geography of the Black Forest
Rock formations of Germany
Landforms of Baden-Württemberg